In geometry, the excavated dodecahedron is a star polyhedron that looks like a dodecahedron with concave pentagonal pyramids in place of its faces. Its exterior surface represents the Ef1g1 stellation of the icosahedron. It appears in Magnus Wenninger's book Polyhedron Models as model 28, the third stellation of icosahedron.

Description

All 20 vertices and 30 of its 60 edges belong to its dodecahedral hull. The 30 other internal edges are longer and belong to a great stellated dodecahedron. (Each contains one of the 30 edges of the icosahedral core.) There are 20 faces corresponding to the 20 vertices. Each face is a self-intersecting hexagon with alternating long and short edges and 60° angles. The equilateral triangles touching a short edge are part of the face. (The smaller one between the long edges is a face of the icosahedral core.)

Faceting of the dodecahedron

It has the same external form as a certain facetting of the dodecahedron having 20 self-intersecting hexagons as faces.  The non-convex hexagon face can be broken up into four equilateral triangles, three of which are the same size. A true excavated dodecahedron has the three congruent equilateral triangles as true faces of the polyhedron, while the interior equilateral triangle is not present.

The 20 vertices of the convex hull match the vertex arrangement of the dodecahedron.

The faceting is a noble polyhedron. With six six-sided faces around each vertex, it is topologically equivalent to a quotient space of the hyperbolic order-6 hexagonal tiling, {6,6} and is an abstract type {6,6}6. It is one of ten abstract regular polyhedra of index two with vertices on one orbit.

Related polyhedra

References

 H.S.M. Coxeter, Regular Polytopes, (3rd edition, 1973), Dover edition, 3.6 6.2 Stellating the Platonic solids, pp.96-104

Polyhedral stellation